Traitors' Gate is a gateway of the Tower of London.

Traitor's, Traitors' or Traitors Gate may also refer to:

Structures
Traitor's Gate, Murshidabad, gate of the palace at Mushidabad, India
Fusiliers' Arch in Dublin, Ireland, erected 1907 and named "Traitors' Gate" by critics

Literature
Traitors' Gate (novel), 2010 high fantasy novel by Kate Elliott
The Traitor's Gate, 1927 novel by Edgar Wallace

Other media
Traitor's Gate (film), 1964 German-British film
"Traitor's Gate" (Spooks), 2002 episode of UK TV series Spooks
Traitors Gate (video game), 1999 video game by Daydream Software
Traitors Gate, a 1994 album by Chelsea